Coeymans may refer to the following in the U.S. state of New York:

Coeymans, New York, a town in Albany County
Coeymans (CDP), New York, a hamlet and CDP in the above town
Coeymans Creek, a stream in Albany County
Coeymans School, an historic school building in the above town
Port of Coeymans, a marine terminal in the above town

See also